Mel Larson (October 1, 1929 – November 1, 2016) was an American professional stock car racing driver. He was a driver in the NASCAR Winston Cup Series from 1955 to 1978.

He died on November 1, 2016, in Las Vegas, Nevada at age 87.

References

1929 births
2016 deaths
NASCAR drivers
Racing drivers from Detroit
Racing drivers from Michigan